The Story of My Wife is a 2021 internationally co-produced romantic drama film written and directed by Ildikó Enyedi, based on the 1942 novel of the same name by Milán Füst. It stars Léa Seydoux, Gijs Naber, Louis Garrel, Sergio Rubini and Jasmine Trinca.

It had its world premiere at the Cannes Film Festival on 14 July 2021. It is scheduled to be released in Hungary on 23 September 2021, by Mozinet, and in Germany on 14 October 2021, by Alamode Film, and in France on 12 January 2022, by Pyramide Distribution.

Cast
 Léa Seydoux as Lizzy
 Gijs Naber as Jakob Störr
 Louis Garrel as Dedin
 Sergio Rubini as Kodor
 Jasmine Trinca as Viola
 Luna Wedler as Grete
 Josef Hader as Herr Lange
 Ulrich Matthes as psychiatrist
 Udo Samel as private investigator

Production
Milán Füst's novel, The Story of My Wife, was one of Enyedi's favorites when she was a teenager, which led her to adapt it into a film. In February 2018, it was announced Léa Seydoux had joined the cast of the film, with Ildikó Enyedi directing from a screenplay she wrote. Monika Mécs, Maren Ade, Jonas Dornbach, Janine Jackowski, Flaminio Zadra, Pilar Saavedra Perrotta producing under their Inforg-M&M Film, Komplizen Film and Palosanto Films banners, respectively. In April 2019, it was announced Gijs Naber, Louis Garrel, Josef Hader,  Sergio Rubini and Jasmine Trinca had joined the cast of the film. The dialogue is primarily in English because in the 1920s English was the primary language in the shipping industry.

Filming began on April 8 and in Hamburg, Budapest, and Malta.

Release
In February 2020, it was announced Rai Cinema, Mozinet, Pyramide Distribution and Almonde would distribute the film in Italy, Hungary, France, and Germany, respectively.

The Story of My Wife had its world premiere at the Cannes Film Festival on 14 July 2021. It is scheduled to be released in Hungary on 23 September 2021. and in Germany on 14 October 2021. and in France on 12 January 2022, by Pyramide Distribution. The film will have its North American Premiere at the 2021 Toronto International Film Festival.

Reception
The Story of My Wife holds a 21% approval rating on review aggregator website Rotten Tomatoes, based on 19 reviews, with a weighted average of 4.60/10. On Metacritic, the film holds a rating of 40 out of 100, based on 5 critics, indicating "mixed or average reviews".

References

External links

2021 films
2021 romantic drama films
English-language French films
English-language German films
English-language Hungarian films
English-language Italian films
Hungarian romantic drama films
German romantic drama films
Italian romantic drama films
French romantic drama films
Films directed by Ildikó Enyedi
2020s English-language films
2020s French films